New Boyz was a hip-hop duo that consisted of rappers Earl "Ben J" Benjamin and Dominic "Legacy" Thomas. They debuted in the spring of 2009 with their viral hit "You're a Jerk" taken from their 2009 debut studio album Skinny Jeanz and a Mic. The song peaked in the top thirty of the Billboard Hot 100, and it was the first song to bring the jerkin' style to the national forefront. A second single, "Tie Me Down" featuring Ray J, was also successful and peaked in the top thirty in Early 2010. In May 2011, their second and final studio album, Too Cool to Care, was released. It includes the top 40 hits "Backseat", featuring The Cataracs and Dev, and "Better with the Lights Off" featuring Chris Brown. The New Boyz have also been featured on Hot Chelle Rae's song "I Like It Like That", which peaked at No. 28 on the Hot 100.

History

2005–2008: Early life and formation 
Benjamin and Thomas met as freshmen at Hesperia High School. The two were originally rivals, but became friends over a common interest in music. Thomas began rapping at the age of eight after watching a music video by Bow Wow, but Benjamin did not have plans to pursue a musical career, instead, he intended to play football at San Diego State University. However, Benjamin decided to focus more on music after he discovered that he had a passion for rapping. With their October birthdays only a day apart, they pooled their gift money to buy recording equipment. Thomas then taught himself how to make beats for the group's songs with a computer program called Fruity Loops, saying "I had to teach myself. We didn't want to pay for beats." After Thomas transferred to a new school in May 2008, they decided to form a group. With Benjamin being "Ben J" and Thomas being "Legacy", they began performing together as the Swagger Boyz on July 4, 2008 and created a MySpace page to promote their self-published single "Colorz".

2009–2012: Skinny Jeanz and a Mic and Too Cool to Care 
In the summer of 2009, the New Boyz' single "You're a Jerk", based on the local dance style of jerkin', became a national hit. "You're a Jerk" peaked on No. 24 on the Billboard Hot 100 and No. 4 on the Hot Rap Tracks charts. The New Boyz' debut album Skinny Jeanz and a Mic was released in September 2009. Released by Shotty and Asylum Records, the album peaked at No. 56 on the Billboard 200 and No. 8 on the Top Rap Albums charts. "Tie Me Down", featuring Ray J, was the second single from the New Boyz' debut album; that song contained Auto-Tune. "Tie Me Down" peaked at No. 22 on the Hot 100 and No. 5 on the Hot Rap Tracks.

In July 2010, New Boyz collaborated with Virgin Islands singer Iyaz on the song "Break My Bank", which peaked at number 68 on the Billboard Hot 100. New Boyz released their second studio album, Too Cool to Care, on May 17, 2011. On the album, the duo planned to focus less on the "jerkin'" aspect of the music, instead emphasizing more diverse influences. Legacy stated that on the previous album, listeners "were more focused on these dudes wearing skinny jeans, 'they are making jerk stuff,' so that's why we made sure on this second album, we let it be known that we can go in." The group planned to experiment with other genres besides hip-hop, including rock. On February 15, 2011, New Boyz released their second single off the album "Backseat", which the song features The Cataracs and Dev. On May 7, 2011 Too Cool to Care was released it sold 30,000 copies in the first week. The third single off the album was "Better with the Lights Off" which featured Chris Brown, The single debuted at number 61 on the Billboard Hot 100 as a promotional single. After being officially released, it re-entered the chart at number 75 and reached a peak of number 38.

2013–2014: Hiatus and reunion 
On February 28, 2013, Legacy announced via Twitter that the group had been working on their third album for Warner Music Bros. Records.  However, on November 9, 2013, after many speculations that the group has gone their separate ways, member Earl "Ben J" Benjamin officially stated they have decided to split up in order to pursue solo careers.  He stated in an interview: "We've shared our talents with the world as a duo and had a very successful career in doing so, our songs stayed on the charts and our videos always received millions and millions of organic views on YouTube and Vevo. But after selling out shows and touring all over the world, we've decided that we'd like to share our talents with our fans individually. Together or apart; we've made our mark in American music history and our imprint will never be forgotten. I wish my brother (Legacy) the best in all that he does, and can’t wait till we're both at the Grammy's getting nominated for our solo efforts; and so begins a New chapter, in a New book; with this New Boy." The group reunited in the 2014 film "School Dance".

2021–2022: Reunion 
On January 18, 2022, the duo released the sequel to their 2009 hit song You're a Jerk; after teasing the group's return in December 2021.

Legal issues
On July 9, 2012, it was announced that New Boyz was being sued in a legal dispute due to copy rights of their name against Christian rock band Newsboys, after confusion over the groups' names.

Discography

Studio albums

Mixtapes

Singles

Promotional singles

As featured artist

Music videos
You're a Jerk
Dot Com
Tie Me Down featuring Ray J
So Dope
Found My Swag featuring The Bangz
Cricketz featuring Tyga
Break My Bank featuring Iyaz
Crush On You featuring YG
Backseat featuring The Cataracs and Dev
Tough Kids featuring Sabi
Better With the Lights Off featuring Chris Brown
Dancing Around the Truth (the Stunners)
New Kid Swag featuring Brandon Soo-Hoo from Incredible Crew
Hot Chelle Rae - I Like It Like That ft. New Boyz
FM$
Stefano - I'm on a Roll ft. Rock Mafia, New Boyz
Tydis - Make Me Say Feat New Boyz

Filmography

Films

References

External links
 
 New Boyz channel at Youtube
 Ben J's channel at Youtube

Asylum Records artists
American musical duos
Hip hop duos
Musical groups established in 2008
Musical groups disestablished in 2013
Hip hop groups from California
African-American musical groups
People from Hesperia, California